Logonna-Daoulas is a commune in the Finistère department of Brittany in north-western France.

Population
Inhabitants of Logonna-Daoulas are called in French
Logonnais.

See also
Communes of the Finistère department
Parc naturel régional d'Armorique
Roland Doré sculptor. Sculptor with work in Logonna Doulas

References

External links
Official website 

Mayors of Finistère Association ;

Communes of Finistère